A. Earl Hedrick (March 2, 1896 – September 18, 1985) was an American art director. He was nominated for an Academy Award in the category Best Art Direction for the film The Proud and Profane.

Selected filmography
 The Proud and Profane (1956)

References

External links

1896 births
1985 deaths
American art directors
People from Los Angeles